Ecommoy Football Club is a French football club based in Écommoy. 
The club, managed by Jean-Noël Visonneau were promoted to the championnat DH in 2008-2009 from the Ligue du Maine.

History 
Founded in 1921 under the name of US Ecommoy, the club made its debut in the Division d'Honneur of the Ligue de football du Maine in 1986-1987. Becoming Ecommoy FC, the Green and Blacks took four titles as champion of the Maine leading to promotion to the national championships. These trips to a higher level were short: two seasons from 1994 to 1996, two seasons from 2001 to 2003, one season in 2005-2006 and the last in 2007-2008.

Honours 
 Champion of DH Maine : 1994, 2001, 2005, 2007
 Winner of the coupe du Maine : 1999, 2002, 2004, 2005

Association football clubs established in 1921
1921 establishments in France
Sport in Sarthe
Football clubs in Pays de la Loire